American Primitive is a play by William Gibson about the lives of John and Abigail Adams. Gibson used the correspondence of John and Abigail Adams to create a verse drama about the period of the American Revolution.

American Primitive debuted, unsuccessfully, at the Berkshire Theatre Festival in 1969. The production, directed by Frank Langella, starred Anne Bancroft as Abigail Adams.

References 

1969 plays
Plays by William Gibson (playwright)
Plays set in the 18th century
Works about the American Revolution
Cultural depictions of John Adams